Issam Erraki (born 5 January 1981) is a Moroccan professional footballer, who plays as a midfielder for  MAS Fez.

International career
In January 2014, coach Hassan Benabicha, invited him to be a part of the Moroccan squad for the 2014 African Nations Championship. He helped the team to top group B after drawing with Burkina Faso and Zimbabwe and defeating Uganda. The team was eliminated from the competition at the quarter final zone after losing to Nigeria.

References

External links

1981 births
Living people
Footballers from Rabat
Moroccan footballers
Morocco international footballers
Moroccan expatriate footballers
AS FAR (football) players
Al-Wehda Club (Mecca) players
Al-Raed FC players
Raja CA players
Emirates Club players
Khor Fakkan Sports Club players
Expatriate footballers in the United Arab Emirates
Expatriate footballers in Saudi Arabia
Morocco A' international footballers
2014 African Nations Championship players
Saudi Professional League players
UAE Pro League players
UAE First Division League players
Moroccan expatriate sportspeople in Saudi Arabia
Association football midfielders
Moroccan expatriate sportspeople in the United Arab Emirates
2016 African Nations Championship players